This World may refer to:
This World on BBC television
"This World" (Selah Sue song), 2011
"This World", a song by The Dream Academy from their 1985 eponymous album
"This World", a song by Earshot from their 2002 debut album Letting Go
 This World (band), an American band
 This World (album)